Kaufungen Abbey was a Benedictine nunnery founded in 1017 by the Empress Cunigunde of Luxembourg, wife of Henry II, Holy Roman Emperor, located in Kaufungen in Hessen, Germany.

History 

In May 1017 Cunigunde was staying on the imperial estate of Kaufungen when, according to Thietmar of Merseburg, she became seriously ill and vowed to found a monastery if she recovered. She did so and her husband Henry endowed the new foundation in 1019. After the death of Henry in 1024, Cunigunde, who was later canonized as well as her husband, became a nun in the new Benedictine monastery, where she died in 1033.

The abbey church was consecrated on 13 July 1025. In 1089, the nunnery became an Imperial abbey, territorially and judicially independent, subject only to the Holy Roman Emperor .

The "Vögte" (advocates, or lords protectors) of Kaufungen Abbey were the Counts of Maden.

During the 12th century, the abbey was transformed to house a community of secular canonesses, becoming a home for unmarried female members of the nobility (Frauenstift). It continued in this form until 1509, when, at the instigation of William II, Landgrave of Hesse, the abbey was returned to the Benedictine Order, under the authority of the Bursfeld Congregation. The canonesses were formed into Benedictines by nuns from Gehrden Abbey.

In 1532, during the Protestant Reformation, Landgrave Philip I of Hesse appropriated it and gave it, together with Wetter Abbey, to the Hessische Ritterschaft (Hessian Knighthood, an association of noble families for the purpose of mutual help) for the care and shelter of female members of those families belonging to it.

As the Ritterschaftliches Stift Kaufungen it still exists today.

Church 
The abbey church, now known as the "Stiftskirche", was dedicated on 13 July 1025. It is now used as the parish church and is counted as the most significant structure of the late Ottonian period in north Hesse. In the westwork the Imperial gallery ("Kaiserempore") was re-discovered in 1938.

References

External links 

  History and pictures of the abbey
  University of Bielefeld: 1788 article on the Ritterstift

Monasteries in Hesse
1017 establishments in Europe
Christian monasteries established in the 11th century
Imperial abbeys
Benedictine nunneries in Germany
Monasteries of secular canonesses
Buildings and structures in Kassel (district)